The Carroll Independent School District (Carroll ISD) is an independent PK-12 school district founded in 1959 serving the majority of the city of Southlake, Texas, and portions of northwest Grapevine, far northern Colleyville, and eastern Westlake.

History
In early 1919 the Carroll Common School District was formed from independent schools near Lonesome Dove and White's Church as well as Sams School. The district was named after B.E. Carroll who was the Tarrant County Superintendent of Public Instruction. The first Carroll School, known at the time as the Carroll Hill School, was completed in 1919 and served as the district's lone school until the opening of the new Carroll High School in the 1970–1971 school year. In 1959, Carroll ISD became an independent school district. Carroll ISD initially only offered kindergarten through 8th grade; students had to travel to Grapevine for high school. The district added 9th grade in the 1961–1962 school year and a high school wing to the building in 1965. Carroll ISD graduated its first senior class in 1965 making Carroll ISD a K-12 grade school district.

After the emergence of a viral video in 2018 which showed several white students from this district shouting a racial slur at a Black student, the school board developed a plan to foster diversity in the curriculum as well as amend the student code of conduct. There was backlash among parents, a majority of whom were white, who denounced the plan as politically motivated. A political action committee was formed by these parents that has been supported by donations from conservative donors, and a lawsuit was filed against the school board.  The process of implementing the diversity plan has been delayed by a temporary restraining order. 
In 2021, a school administrator was recorded telling teachers to present opposing viewpoints on the Holocaust. Six months after teachers at the Carroll Independent School District went public with their concerns about the administrator’s advice to balance books on the Holocaust with titles that show “opposing” perspectives, district employees discovered that a new clause had been added to their annual employment contracts, reading "You agree to not disparage, criticize, or defame the District, and its employees or officials, to the media.”

Overview
Carroll ISD is consistently ranked among the top-rated school districts in Texas.  The district and all of its schools are often all rated "Exemplary" by the Texas Education Agency. In the 2004-2005 and 2005-2006 school years, the district was dropped to the "Recognized" ranking. In the 2006–2007 school year, the district not only regained the "Exemplary" ranking, but also became the largest all-Exemplary school district in Texas. Carroll ISD still holds this title today.

Carroll ISD also staffs all of its schools with campus resource officers. All officers are full-time members of the Southlake Police Department. The decision to expand the resource officer program (which had previously included only two officers and a sergeant) was made in the wake of the 2012 school shooting in Newtown, Connecticut. The program now includes 11 officers and one sergeant.

Demographics

In 2021 the median price of a single family residence in the district was $650,000.

Mascot
All of the district's schools share the same colors (green, white, and black) and the same mascot (the Dragon). The mascot was created by a student in the mid-eighties by combining an outline of Texas with a US Navy electronic warfare squadron emblem. The logo was first used in the 1980s as helmet emblems for the Carroll Dragon Varsity Football teams and gradually adopted as the district mascot.  Previously, Carroll Middle School used the mascot of the Knights, using the same color scheme as the Dragons.  The Knights mascot was retired in the 1990s.

Schools

High school (Grades 9-12)
 Carroll Senior High School (grades 11–12)
 Carroll High School (grades 9–10)
1994-96 National Blue Ribbon School

Middle schools (Grades 7-8)
Dawson Middle School
Carroll Middle School
1994-96 National Blue Ribbon School

Intermediate schools (Grades 5-6)
Durham Intermediate School
Eubanks Intermediate School

Elementary schools (Grades PK-4)
Carroll Elementary School
1993-94 National Blue Ribbon School
Johnson Elementary School
1993-94 National Blue Ribbon School
Old Union Elementary School
Rockenbaugh Elementary School
2006 National Blue Ribbon School
Walnut Grove Elementary School

Former schools
Carroll Intermediate
2000-01 National Blue Ribbon School
Closed at the end of the 2002–2003 school year with significant portions now leased to Southlake Baptist Church.
Carroll Junior High School
Converted at the end of the 2001–2002 school year into Carroll High School.
Durham Elementary School
Closed at the end of the 2010–2011 school year and all students moved to new Walnut Grove Elementary School. The former physical campus has wholly become part of Durham Intermediate School.
"Old" Carroll Middle School
The facility was left in the summer of 2011 to move to a new campus under the same name. The building has been renovated to accommodate the needs to be housed by the CISD Administration Center.

See also
 VAQ-130

References

External links

 Carroll Theatre Department
 Southlake Historical Society

School districts in Tarrant County, Texas
School districts established in 1919
1919 establishments in Texas